Manthiri Kumaran is a 1963 Indian Tamil-language film directed by B. Vittalacharya. The film stars Kanta Rao, Anuradha and Rajasree.

Plot 
Madana, a prince in exile, falls in love with a statue. His friend, Guna Keerthi, realizes that princess Rathnavali resembles the statue and decides to unite the lovelorn prince with Rathnavali.

Cast 
The list is adapted from the film titles.

Male cast
Kantha Rao
Raja
Balakrishnan
Lanka Sathyam
Satyanarayana

Female cast
Anuradha
Rajasree
Meenakumari
Jayanthi
Shanthi

Production 
The film was produced by Kandasamy and Gopalasamy and was directed by B. Vittalacharya. The writer was B. V. Acharya. Cinematography was done by G. Chandru While K. Govindasamy was in charge of editing. Art direction was by B. V. Babu.
The film was made in Telugu with the title Madana Kamaraju Katha and was released in 1962.

Soundtrack 
Music was composed by Rajan–Nagendra while the lyrics were penned by Puratchidasan. Playback singers are T. M. Soundararajan, P. Susheela, S. C. Krishnan and Jikki.

References

External links 

Films based on Indian folklore
Films scored by Rajan–Nagendra
Tamil remakes of Telugu films
1960s Tamil-language films